The Maniq or Mani are an ethnic group of Thailand. They are more widely known in Thailand as the Sakai, a controversial derogatory term meaning 'barbarism'. They are the only Negrito group in Thailand and speak a variety of related Aslian languages, primarily Kensiu and Ten'edn. They have their own language, culture, and no alphabet.

In Thailand, the Maniq minority live in the southern provinces of Yala, Narathiwat, Phatthalung, Trang, and Satun.

Characteristics
The Maniq are a hunting and gathering society. They build temporary huts of bamboo with roofs made of banana leaves. They hunt many types of animals and consume many different kinds of vegetables and fruits. They wear simple clothes made of materials such as bamboo leaves.  They are familiar with many different species of medicinal herbs.

The director-general of the Rights and Liberties Protection Department of the Justice Ministry, said the Maniq are categorised into two groups based on where they live. The first group lives in the Titiwangsa Mountains in Yala and Narathiwat while the second group dwells in the Banthat Mountains in Phatthalung, Trang, and Satun.

The total population of the Maniq is about 300 people. However, they are divided into several different clans.

Among the Malaysian sultans and rulers of the southern provinces of Thailand who ruled and enslaved the Negrito slaves, it was once regarded as prestigious to keep Negritos in their yards as part of collections of amusing jungle beings. In the first decade of the twentieth century, the king of Thailand, King Chulalongkorn (Rama V) visited the southern regions of his country and met with the Semang people. In 1906, an orphan Semang boy who was captured and named Khanung was sent to the royal court, where he was perceived as the adoptive son of the ruler. From this event, it has led to the patronage of the Semang people by the royal court.

Migration 
Occasionally, Mani Clans will move to a new area. Hunters are sent to navigate the terrain in order to find a spot for their clan to setup camp. When a spot is found the hunters return to their clan to bring them to their new home.

See also
Negrito
Semang
Batek people
Lanoh people
List of ethnic groups in Thailand

References

External links
Film: Last Foragers Standing. The daily life of the Maniq
Mani people : Ethnic ‘negrito’ tribe of Thailand
The Negrito of Thailand
Ethnologue report for Tonga language
Thailand Mani indigenous data
RWAAI (Repository and Workspace for Austroasiatic Intangible Heritage)
http://hdl.handle.net/10050/00-0000-0000-0003-66FA-7@view Maniq in RWAAI Digital Archive

Indigenous peoples of Southeast Asia
Ethnic groups in Thailand
Hunter-gatherers of Asia
Negritos